Scorpiopsis is a moth genus of the family Depressariidae.

Species
 Scorpiopsis diplaneta (Meyrick, 1930)
 Scorpiopsis exanthistis Meyrick, 1930
 Scorpiopsis pyrobola (Meyrick, 1887)
 Scorpiopsis rhodoglauca Meyrick, 1930

References

Depressariinae
Moth genera